Varanus citrinus is a species of monitor lizard in the family Varanidae. The species is endemic to Australia.

References

Varanus
Reptiles of the Northern Territory
Reptiles described in 2022
Monitor lizards of Australia